Printers Inc. Bookstore (1978–2001) was an independent bookstore in Palo Alto and  Mountain View, California, that closed in 2001.  Printers Inc is referenced in sonnets 8.13-8.16 of Vikram Seth's 1986 novel, The Golden Gate.

History
In 1978, five Kepler's Books alumni (including Jeffrey Shurtleff and Anne Leathers) founded Printers Inc. Bookstore.  The original Palo Alto store at 310 California Avenue occupied a former thrift store location. A second store was located at 301 Castro Street in Mountain View, California. Printers Inc. Bookstore was also a popular destination for Stanford University students. The Printers Inc. Cafe originally shared space in the California Avenue branch in Palo Alto and subsequently moved next door. American author Frances Mayes describes this history in her 2006 memoir, A Year in the World: Journeys of a Passionate Traveller:

In the early 1990s, chain bookstores such as Borders and Barnes & Noble began to compete with independent bookstores such as Printers Inc.  The rise of Amazon.com also affected Printers Inc. and other independent bookstores.  Thus, in December 1998, Printers Inc. announced that it would be closing. The local community protested the closing, however, as the owners began to search for a new partner. In March 1999 Printers Inc. was resurrected under new management. This management lasted until 2001 when Printers Inc. Bookstore closed for good. The Printers Inc. Cafe, however, did not close as it is under different management.

Documentary
The 2006 documentary Indies Under Fire tells the story of Printers Inc. and other independent bookstores affected by the new economy. Director Jacob Bricca stated that he made the documentary after Printers Inc. closed: "I took the [store's closing] very personally ... I grew up in Palo Alto and spent many hours reading and hanging out at Printers Inc. I saw the strong connection the community had to the bookstore and, like others in the film, was very distressed at its closing."

Photographs
Photograph of Printers Inc. Bookstore in Palo Alto
Photographs of Printers Inc. Bookstore - Palo Alto Historical Association
Photographs inside Printers Inc. Bookstore

See also
Cody's Books
Kepler's Books

References

External links
"Local artist paints history in mural" - The Stanford Daily, October 2, 1979.
"DIVERSIONS: Browsing through . . ." - The Stanford Daily, August 13, 1982.
"For Book Lovers Only" - The Stanford Daily, September 22, 1983.
"Tomes and Texts To Buy or Browse" - The Stanford Daily, September 23, 1985.
"Local Bookstores" - The Stanford Daily, January 1, 1986.

Independent bookstores of the United States
Defunct retail companies of the United States
Bookstores in the San Francisco Bay Area
Buildings and structures in Palo Alto, California
History of the San Francisco Bay Area
Companies based in Palo Alto, California
Defunct companies based in the San Francisco Bay Area
Retail companies established in 1978
Retail companies disestablished in 2001
1978 establishments in California
2001 disestablishments in California
Bookstores in California